The Changzhou Mosque is a mosque in Tianning District, Changzhou City, Jiangsu Province, China.

History
The mosque was originally built during the Hongwu Emperor of Ming Dynasty. The original building was lowly shed and was repaired during the Wanli Emperor of Ming Dynasty and Tongzhi Emperor of Qing Dynasty. In 1996, it was rebuilt at its original site. In 2003, it was moved to the southeast corner junction of Gongyuan Road and Shuanggui Fang due to the needs of city construction. The relocation was completed in 2006.

Architecture
The mosque has an Arabic style of architecture which covers an area of 1,354 m2. Its total floor area is 4,800 m2. It consists of six floors for the main lobby and eight floors for local part in picturesque disorder. Its arched dome is 36 meters high and the minarets are 51 meters high. The whole building can accommodate up to 800 worshipers.

Transportation
The mosque is accessible south west of Changzhou Railway Station.

See also
 Islam in China
 List of mosques in China

References

2006 establishments in China
Buildings and structures in Changzhou
Mosques completed in 2006
Mosques in China
Religious buildings and structures in Jiangsu